María Jiray is a man-made waterfall located at 3400 meters above sea level, near the town of Acopalca, in the Peruvian region of Ancash. It has an approximate height of 300 meters and is the byproduct of an aqueduct for a nearby hydroelectric plant, as water in excess is diverted to the creek where the waterfall is located. It is a local attraction for trekkers, along with remnants of Andean forests.

References 

Landforms of Ancash Region
Waterfalls of Peru